Natural Selections is the second album by Brad Laner, released on August 24, 2010 through Hometapes.

Track listing

Personnel 
Musicians
Brad Laner – vocals, instruments, engineering, photography
Julian Laner – electric guitar, vocals
Chris Pitman – additional vocals
Jordan Zadoronzy – acoustic guitar, bass guitar, piano, drums, percussion
Production and additional personnel
Thom Monahan – mixing

References

External links 
 

2010 albums
Brad Laner albums